Elachista ohridella is a moth of the family Elachistidae. It is found in North Macedonia and Bulgaria.

References

ohridella
Moths described in 2001
Moths of Europe